The Nonhyeon-dong massacre was a mass murder that occurred in the Gangnam-gu ward of Seoul, South Korea on October 20, 2008, when 30-year-old Jeong Sang-jin (정상진) set fire in a goshiwon and slashed several women with a  sashimi knife. A total of six people died in the incident and seven more were injured. Jeong was sentenced to death on May 12, 2009.

Details
At about 8:15 a.m., according to police, Jeong, who lived on the third floor of a four-story gosiwon, a low-cost lodging facility, poured gasoline on his bed and set it ablaze. Dressed all in black, wearing a headlamp, and hiding his face with a balaclava and goggles, he emerged from his smoke-filled room and, armed with a sashimi knife, two fruit-knives strapped to his legs, and a tear gas gun in a belt holster, began slashing and stabbing the residents of the building who were fleeing the fire.

Five people died of the wounds Jeong had inflicted on them with his knife, one woman died when she jumped out of a window in the fourth floor in an attempt to escape, and another seven were injured, four seriously, either by Jeong or the fire. Three of the dead and three of the injured were Chinese citizens. The fire raged in the building for about 30 minutes, before around 100 firefighters finally succeeded in taming the flames.

At 9:20 a.m., Jeong, initially thought to be another victim, was rescued by a fireman from a storage room in the fourth floor where he was hiding. When police noticed his peculiar behavior, Jeong was interrogated at the scene and he confessed to the crime. He was immediately arrested and brought to Gangnam Police Station, where he was charged with homicide and arson.

The perpetrator
Jeong Sang-jin, originally from Hapcheon, South Gyeongsang Province, moved to Seoul in 2002, where he scratched a living with part-time jobs as food delivery man or parking valet, though as of April 2008 he was unemployed and had to face severe financial difficulties. According to unconfirmed reports, he was convicted eight times, once for skipping an obligatory training for military reservists, for which he was fined of 1.5 million won.

During interrogations, he said he was persecuted since his childhood days and attempted suicide twice during his time at middle school. He claimed that he occasionally suffered from severe headaches since those attempts.

Motives
Jeong was in severe financial distress and couldn't pay his rent and mobile phone fees for months prior to the rampage. After his arrest, he stated that he didn't want to live anymore, as everyone looked down on him. It was said that he might have wanted to express his anger towards the rich and high authorities, but as they were difficult targets, he lashed out against those who were at hand.

Further blame was also laid on the film A Bittersweet Life by Kim Jee-woon, which Jeong was said to like.

Similar incidents
The incident sparked memories of the Daegu subway fire and the arson of the Namdaemun the same year, as well as the Akihabara massacre that happened just a few months earlier in Japan.

External links
조폭영화 보고 “멋있다”… 흉기 사들여
고시원 방화살해사건..“영화 ‘달콤한 인생’ 관람후 범행도구 준비”
2 Chinese killed in Seoul arson, stabbing spree
6 Killed in Arson, Stabbing Rampage in South Korea, FOX News (October 20, 2008)
S Korean man kills 6 in stabbing, arson spree
Growing population of Korean Chinese silently endure hardships after arrival in Korea, The Hankyoreh (October 22, 2008)
2 Chinese killed in Seoul arson, stabbing spree, China Daily (October 20, 2008)
Korean arson suspect attends an on-site inspection, China Daily (October 23, 2008)
논현동 고시원서 '묻지마 살인'

References

Deaths by stabbing in South Korea
Building and structure fires in South Korea
Mass murder in 2008
Arson in South Korea
Crime in Seoul
2008 murders in South Korea
Mass murder in South Korea
Mass stabbings in Asia
Hotel fires
Massacres in South Korea